Jen Dziura is a New York-based writer, educational humorist, and educator.

Early life 
Jen Dziura was born and raised in Virginia Beach. In the mid-nineties, Dziura worked as the teen columnist for the Virginian Pilot, after pitching for the position with a hand-written letter. She was a philosophy major at Dartmouth College, the first person in her family to attend college. While in her sophomore year she started her first company, an internet marketing firm, and had 8 part-time employees by graduation. She has perfect GRE and SAT scores and a 780 on the GMAT, and has spent over a decade teaching in the adult education field.

Career and writing 
Dziura graduated from Dartmouth College. In 2010, Dziura began writing Bullish, an advice column originally on The Gloss. Bullish also appeared on The Grindstone and the Daily Muse, before being headquartered on the GetBullish website. Koa Beck on DailyWorth wrote: "Get Bullish advocates designing your own career by finding fulfilling ways to create value in what you do."

She is the author of two sets of GRE flashcards, the lead author and editor of The 5 Lb. Book of GRE Practice Problems, the author of Foundations of GMAT Verbal, and co-author of or contributor to numerous other test prep, debate, and logic books. While the Foundations of the GMAT Verbal textbook cite that Dziura has contributed to "over a dozen educational books", the extent of such contributions and the number of contributions is unauthenticated.

Dziura wrote 22-page booklet for Vice magazine on "How to Debate" to promote Dewar's Scotch. She has written and performed comedy, touring the country and performing for the troops in Iraq.

Conference 
Dziura founded the annual Bullish Conference, first held in 2013. The conference was originally held in Miami, FL but moved to Dziura's hometown of New York City in 2015, and will be held in California in 2016. Autostraddle described the Bullish Conference as "A vacation that helps you meet your goals in a powerful, focused, and inspiring way?"

The Williamsburg Spelling Bee 
From 2004 to 2016, Dziura co-hosted the Williamsburg Spelling be with bobbyblue. Lauren Gill of The Brooklyn Paper wrote the Williamsburg Spelling Bee had "become so famous that "Law and Order: Special Victims Unit" once modeled a murder victim on Dziura."

References

Year of birth missing (living people)
Living people
People from Virginia Beach, Virginia
American women writers
Dartmouth College alumni
American women comedians
American women journalists
Journalists from Virginia
21st-century American women